This is a list of the 129 members of the 49th Parliament of Haiti, elected in the 2010-2011 election.

Senate

Delegation from Artibonite Department

Delegation from Centre Department

Delegation from Grand'Anse Department

Delegation from Nippes Department

Delegation from Nord Department

Delegation from Nord-Est Department

Delegation from Nord-Ouest Department

Delegation from Ouest Department

Delegation from Sud Department

Delegation from Sud-Est Department

Chamber of Deputies

Delegation from Artibonite Department

Delegation from Centre Department

Delegation from Grand'Anse Department

Delegation from Nippes Department

Delegation from Nord Department

Delegation from Nord-Est Department

Delegation from Nord-Ouest Department

Delegation from Ouest Department

Delegation from Sud Department

Delegation from Sud-Est Department

External links
Source of data for both senate and chamber of Deputies

Members of the Haitian Parliament
Parliament